Nola Hatterman (12 August 1899 – 8 May 1984) was a Dutch actress and painter.

Hatterman was born in Amsterdam as an only child in a large house on the Middenweg in the Watergraafsmeer district. Her father was an accountant with Mirandolle, Voûte & Co. She drew and painted from a young age and followed an education at the gymnasium. Among her school friends were many Indonesian students whose parents were affiliated with her father's offices. Later she would reminisce about these early friendships and explain that they were the seed for her passion for painting colored people.

Acting career
In 1914 she continued to paint, but chose to study at the Amsterdam Acting school (Toneel Academie). In 1918 she joined the Rotterdam acting house NV Het Rotterdams Toneel. She returned to Amsterdam after joining the national KVHNT and acted in the Stadsschouwburg Amsterdam. In the same period she also acted in a few films from 1916-1925 but gave it up when her parents moved to the Falckstraat. She had a workshop of her own in the attic there, where she could concentrate on painting.

Painting career
  
She took lessons from Vittorio Schiavon and Charles Haak. She also came in contact with Surinamers who earned money as models. One of them, Frans Vroom, moved in the downstairs apartment for a short period after her father died. Through her association with Surinamers, she became more politically active and became very impressed with the 1934 book by Anton de Kom, We Slaves of Surinam (Wij slaven van Suriname). She decided to work on historical illustrations to educate children about their heroes, and specifically, anatomically correct representations of colored people in art for children. She slowly formed the idea of going to Paramaribo to open a school and begin creating such illustrations, but was delayed by the war.

After her mother died, in 1953 she moved to Paramaribo and began to live her dream. According to a late interview, she was most proud of a series of history paintings of Surinam. She taught many students to draw and paint, and notable pupils were Armand Baag and Ruben Karsters. Baag interviewed her in the 1982 film Nola Hatterman (en de konsekwente keuze).

Hatterman died in a car crash in Paramaribo.

Works
Nola Hatterman is best known for her portraits of people of color, but she also made still-life paintings and illustrations for magazines. Works by Hatterman are held mostly in private collections, but a few paintings are in the Stedelijk Museum, Tropenmuseum, and the Surinaams Museum.

Nola Hatterman Art Academy

In 1984, after her death, the Nola Hatterman Institute was opened by her former students. The name was later changed to Nola Hatterman Art Academy. The Academy is located in the former commander's house in Fort Zeelandia, Paramaribo. In 1997, an art gallery was opened by members of Ons Suriname. This gallery specialises in Surinamese art and annually displays an artist connected to the Nola Hatterman Art Academy.

References

Notes

Sources
 Nola Hatterman in 1001 Vrouwen
 Nola. Portret van een eigenzinnige kunstenares., book by Ellen de Vries, Amersfoort, 2008
 Cultuur en migratie in Nederland. Kunsten in beweging 1900-1980, page 257, 17 april 1953. Nola Hatterman vertrekt naar Suriname en ontwikkelt zich tot leermeesteres van een generatie Surinaams-Nederlandse beeldende kunstenaars., by Rosemarie Buikema, Maaike Meijer, 2003 (Digital Library for Dutch Literature)

External links
 Official website
 Nola Hatterman at the Werkgroep Caraïbische Letteren (in Dutch)

1899 births
1984 deaths
Actresses from Amsterdam
Dutch women painters
Women educators
Road incident deaths in Suriname
Painters from Amsterdam
Dutch emigrants to Suriname
Surinamese painters